MacGregor Airfield  is located  east of MacGregor, Manitoba, Canada.

References

Registered aerodromes in Manitoba